Afon Eden is a tributary river than runs into the Afon Mawddach in Gwynedd, Wales.
It is a protected river because it is one of the few breeding grounds for freshwater pearl mussels.

References

Rivers of Gwynedd
Rivers of Snowdonia